Big Bear is a 2017 American comedy film directed, produced, written and starring Joey Kern, also starring Pablo Schreiber, Adam Brody, Ahna O'Reilly, Tyler Labine and Zachary Knighton.

Plot
When Joe shows up for his bachelor party that his friends, Eric, Nick and Colin, have thrown for him, he has to tell them that his fiancé, Jess, broke up with him the night before as she's in love with someone else. They encourage him to stay and party anyway to help cheer him up. The next morning after a long night of drinking, Eric shows them that he has kidnapped the guy Jess left Joe for, "Dude". He is tied and bound to a chair in the basement of the cabin they are staying and Joe debates whether to let him go or scare him into leaving Jess.

Cast
 Pablo Schreiber as Dude
 Adam Brody as Eric
 Ahna O'Reilly as Jess
 Toby Huss as Cop
 Tyler Labine as Nick
 Zachary Knighton as Colin
 Joey Kern as Joe
 Patricia Rae as Waitress
 Heidi Heaslet as Susan

Production
The film is Joey Kern's directorial debut, which he also wrote and produced the film with MTY Productions President Brandon Evans, Brett Forbes and Patrick Rizzotti of Fortress Features and Luke Edwards.

References

External links
 
 

2017 films
2017 comedy films
2017 directorial debut films
2010s American films
2010s English-language films
American comedy films
Films about kidnapping
Films scored by Anton Sanko